Mukhiyapatti Musharniya  is a rural municipality in Dhanusha District in Province No. 2 of south-eastern Nepal established in 2073. As of 2011 Nepal census, it has a population of 25,482. It was formed by joining Tulsiyahi Nikas, Tulsiyani Jabdi, Baheda Bela and former Mukhiyapatti Musharniya Village development committees. The total area of Nagarain municipality is 26.84 km2.

Lowest altitude in Nepal 
On a geographical basis, it is the lowest point in Nepal from sea level, the highest being the peak of Mount Everest.

Notable people 

 Ram Saroj Yadav, CA member, Member of Provincial Assembly and Minister of Physical Infrastructure Development of Madhesh Pradesh.
 Kavindra Nath Thakur, member of 2nd Nepalese Constituent Assembly

See also 

 Bimalendra Nidhi

References

External links
UN map of the municipalities of Dhanusa District

Populated places in Dhanusha District
Rural municipalities of Nepal established in 2017
Rural municipalities in Madhesh Province